This is a timeline documenting events of Jazz in the year 1958.

Events

July
 3 – The 5th Newport Jazz Festival started in Newport, Rhode Island (July 3 – 6).

August
 12 – A Great Day in Harlem, a black and white group photograph of 57 notable jazz musicians, is taken in front of a brownstone building in Harlem, New York City.

Album releases

Cannonball Adderley: Somethin' Else
Chet Baker: Everything Happens to Me
Art Blakey: Moanin' (recorded, released 1959)
Stan Getz and the Oscar Peterson Trio: Stan Getz and the Oscar Peterson Trio
Jimmy Giuffre
Western Suite (recorded, released 1960)
The Four Brothers Sound
Chico Hamilton: "South Pacific in Hi-Fi"
Stan Kenton: Back to Balboa
Blue Mitchell: Big 6
Hank Mobley: Peckin' Time
Thelonious Monk: Misterioso
Max Roach: Deeds, Not Words
Sonny Rollins: Freedom Suite
Mongo Santamaria: Yambu
John Serry Sr.: Chicago Musette – John Serry and His Accordion <ref>[http://catalogue.bnf.fr/ark:/12148/cb38048510x Chicago Musette – John Serry et son Accordéon on bnf.fr]</ref>
Cecil Taylor: Looking Ahead!Clark Terry: In OrbitToots Thielemans: Man Bites Harmonica!Cal Tjader: Latin Concert''

Standards

Deaths

 January
 1 – Fulton McGrath, American pianist and songwriter (born 1907).

 March
 17 – Carl Perkins, American pianist (born 1928).
 25 – Tom Brown, New Orleans trombonist (born 1888).
 28 – W. C. Handy, African-American blues composer and musician (born 1873).

 May
 8 – Ted Donnelly, American trombonist (born 1912).

 June
 Sterling Bose, American trumpeter and cornetist (born 1906).

 July
 2 – Martha Boswell, American singer and pianist (born 1905).

 September
 13 – Lorraine Geller, American pianist (born 1928).
 17 – Herbie Fields, American saxophonist and clarinetist, bandleader (born 1919).

 October
 2 – George E. Lee, American bandleader (born 1896).

 November
 7 – Joe Morris, American trumpeter and bandleader (born 1922).
 11 – Olivia Plunket Greene, English musician, Bright Young Things (born 1907).
 26 – Tiny Bradshaw, American bandleader, singer, composer, pianist, and drummer (born 1907).
 30 – Shifty Henry, American bassist and songwriter (born 1921).

 December
 6 – Danny Alvin, American drummer and bandleader (born 1902).
 25 – Doc Cook, American bandleader and arranger (born 1891).

Births

 January
 26 – Anita Baker, American singer-songwriter
 30 – Bjørn Klakegg, Norwegian guitarist.
 31 – Tom Schuman, American keyboardist.

 February
 3 – Bob Holz, American drummer and composer.
 7 – Frans Bak, Danish composer, choral conductor, saxophonist, and pianist.
 8 – Bill Evans, American saxophonist.
 10 – Michael Weiss, American pianist and composer.
 18 – Gar Samuelson, American drummer (died 1999).
 20 – Leroy Jones, American trumpeter.
 23 – Carles Cases, Spanish-Catalonian pianist and cellist.
 24 – Jerry Zigmont, American trombonist

 March
 5 – Ronan Guilfoyle, Irish acoustic bass guitarist.
 10 – Jeanie Bryson, American singer.
 12 – Leon Lee Dorsey, American bassist.
 15 – Gerald L. Cannon, American upright bassist and visual artist.
 19 – Anne-Marie Giørtz, Norwegian singer.
 31 – Bajone, Serbian singer.

 April
 16 – Ulf Wakenius, Swedish guitarist.
 17 – Chieli Minucci, American guitarist, composer, and producer.
 30 – Ronaldo Folegatti, Brazilian composer, guitarist, and record producer (died 2007).

 May
 7 – Michael Formanek, American upright bassist.
 10 – Claude Deppa, South African trumpeter.
 17 – Carlos del Junco, Cuban-Canadian harmonica player.
 20 – Jesse Boyd, American upright bassist.
 29
 Jim Snidero, American saxophonist.
 Kenny Washington, American drummer.

 June
 6 – Wolfgang Mitterer, Austrian composer, organist, and keyboardist.
 7
 Jonas Hellborg, Swedish bass guitarist.
 Prince Rogers Nelson, American singer-songwriter, multi-instrumentalist, and record producer (died 2016).
 8 – Jakko Jakszyk, English guitarist and singer-songwriter.
 14 – Kenny Drew, Jr., American pianist (died 2014).

 July
 8 – Jim Campilongo, American guitarist and composer.
 10 – Béla Fleck, American banjo player.
 11 – Kirk Whalum, American saxophonist and songwriter.
 18 – Gabriel Fliflet, Norwegian accordionist and singer.
 26 – Deirdre Cartwright, British guitarist and composer.
 30 – Kevin Mahogany, American vocalist (died 2017).

 August
 26
 Andrew Lamb, American saxophonist and flautist.
 David Finck, American bassist.
 29 – Jesse McGuire, American trumpeter.

 September
 3 – Lakki Patey, Norwegian guitarist and inventor.
 5 – Lars Danielsson, Swedish upright bassist, composer, and record producer.
 7 – Bruce Barth, American pianist.
 8 – Stevie Vallance, Canadian singer.
 16 – Rodney Franklin, American pianist and composer.
 25 – Greg Boyer, American trombonist.
 27
 Paul Grabowsky, American pianist and composer.

 October
 1 – Ana Caram, Brazilian singer, guitarist, and flutist.
 6 – Roberto Gatto, Italian drummer.
 9 – Satoko Fujii, Japanese pianist, accordionist and composer.
 13 – Jair-Rôhm Parker Wells, American bassist.
 14 – Tomas Franck, Swedish tenor saxophonist.
 17 – Howard Alden, American guitarist.
 22 – Jan Gunnar Hoff, Norwegian pianist and composer.
 27 – David Hazeltine, American pianist.
 30 – Olav Dale, Norwegian saxophonist, composer and orchestra leader (died 2014).

 November
 1 – Joe DeRenzo, American drummer, composer, and producer.
 8 – Don Byron, American composer, clarinetist, and multi-instrumentalist.
 13 – Tony Lakatos, Hungarian saxophonist.

 December
 9 – George Koller, Canadian bassist and multi-instrumentalist.
 10 – John Goldsby, American upright bassist, bandleader, and composer.
 15 – Don Laka, South African pianist, songwriter, and producer.
 16 – Erna Yuzbashyan, Armenian singer.
 28 – David Berkman, American pianist, composer, and arranger.
 29 – George Schuller, American drummer.
 30
 Ellen Sandweiss, American singer and actress.
 Lewis Nash, American drummer.

 Unknown date
 Carol Chaikin, American saxophonist, flautist, and composer.
 David Newton, Scottish pianist and composer.
 Nancy Zeltsman, American marimba soloist.

See also

 1950s in jazz
 List of years in jazz
 1958 in music

References

Bibliography

External links 
 History Of Jazz Timeline: 1958 at All About Jazz

Jazz
Jazz by year